The 2011 Tokyo Marathon was the fifth edition of the annual marathon race in Tokyo, Japan and was held on Sunday, 27 February. The men's race was won by Ethiopian Hailu Mekonnen in a time of 2:07:35, while the women's race was won by home athlete Noriko Higuchi in 2:28:49. The original winner of the women's race was Tatyana Aryasova of Russia in 2:27:29, but she was later disqualified after failing a doping test.

Results

Men

Women

References

Results
 Results. Association of Road Racing Statisticians. Retrieved 2020-04-02.

External links

 Official website

Tokyo Marathon
Tokyo
2011 in Tokyo
Tokyo Marathon
Tokyo Marathon